Takanlı is a village in Mersin Province, Turkey. It is a part of Mezitli district which is an intracity district of Greater Mersin. It is situated in the peneplain at the South of Toros Mountains. The population is 358 as of 2012.

References

Villages in Mezitli District